Sieranevada is a 2016 Romanian film directed by Cristi Puiu and starring Mimi Brănescu. The plot follows a successful neurologist who attends a family meal supposed to commemorate his deceased father. It was selected to compete for the Palme d'Or at the 2016 Cannes Film Festival. It was selected as the Romanian entry for the Best Foreign Language Film at the 89th Academy Awards, but it was not nominated.

Cast
Mimi Brănescu – Lary
Judith State – Sandra
Bogdan Dumitrache – Relu
Dana Dogaru – Nușa
Sorin Medeleni – Toni
Ana Ciontea – Ofelia
Rolando Matsangos – Gabi

Production
The film is produced through Mandragora SRL in collaboration with Studioul de Creație Cinematografică Romania, Bosnia and Herzegovina's 2006 d.o.o., Croatia's Spiritus Movens, Macedonia's Sisters and Brother Mitevski Production and France's Alcatraz Films. It received 1,639,000 lei in support from the Romanian National Film Centre, 200,000 euro from Eurimages, 91,500 euro from the Croatian Audiovisual Centre and 84,000 euro from the Macedonian Film Fund.

Filming took place in Bucharest from January to March 2015.

Reception

Critical reception
On review aggregator website Rotten Tomatoes, the film holds an approval rating of 92% based on 48 reviews, and an average rating of 7.5/10. The website's critical consensus reads, "Sieranevada targets a narrow viewing demographic, but hits its targets with intelligence, humor, and patient craft." On Metacritic, the film has a weighted average score of 82 out of 100, based on 10 critics, indicating "universal acclaim".

Awards
At the 2017 Gopo Awards, Sieranevada won the following:

 Best Film

 Best Director (Puiu)

 Best Screenplay (Puiu)

 Best Lead Actress (Dogaru)

 Best Supporting Actress (Ciontea)

 Best Editing (Letiția Ștefănescu, Ciprian Cimpoi)

See also
 List of submissions to the 89th Academy Awards for Best Foreign Language Film
 List of Romanian submissions for the Academy Award for Best Foreign Language Film

References

External links
 
 Focus on Sieranevada at LUXprize.eu
 

2016 films
Films directed by Cristi Puiu
Films shot in Bucharest
Romanian comedy-drama films
2010s Romanian-language films